Radio Grude is a Herzegovinian commercial radio station, broadcasting from Grude, Bosnia and Herzegovina.

Radio Grude was launched on 18 November 1998.

Frequencies

The program is currently broadcast on 3 frequencies:

 Grude  
 Grude  
 Mostar

See also 
List of radio stations in Bosnia and Herzegovina

References

External links 
 www.radiogrude.net
 Communications Regulatory Agency of Bosnia and Herzegovina

Grude
Radio stations established in 1998

Grude